James Paterson (25 January 1889 – 21 August 1966) was a New Zealand cricketer. He played first-class cricket for Auckland, Canterbury and Hawke's Bay between 1912 and 1923.

Paterson married Eva Paddy in the Christchurch suburb of Sydenham in November 1913.

See also
 List of Auckland representative cricketers

References

External links
 

1889 births
1966 deaths
New Zealand cricketers
Auckland cricketers
Canterbury cricketers
Hawke's Bay cricketers
Sportspeople from Canterbury